Proximity Park Historic District is a national historic district located at Asheville, Buncombe County, North Carolina.  The district encompasses 62 contributing buildings and 1 contributing site in a predominantly residential section of Asheville. The district was largely developed in early-20th century, and includes representative examples of Colonial Revival, Mission Revival, and Bungalow style dwellings. Located in the district is the separately listed St. Mary's Church (1914) and rectory (1923) designed by architect Richard Sharp Smith.

It was listed on the National Register of Historic Places in 2008.

Gallery

References

Houses on the National Register of Historic Places in North Carolina
Historic districts on the National Register of Historic Places in North Carolina
Colonial Revival architecture in North Carolina
Mission Revival architecture in North Carolina
Houses in Asheville, North Carolina
National Register of Historic Places in Buncombe County, North Carolina